John Macready may refer to:
 John Macready (gymnast)
 John A. Macready, American test pilot and aviator
 John Macready (British Army officer)